The Renault RE20 was a Formula One car raced by the Renault team in the  season. The car was designed by François Castaing and Michel Tétu and designed using Ground effect aerodynamics. The car was powered by the 1.5L turbocharged Renault Gordini EF1 engine, which by 1981 was producing a reported . This was roughly 50 more than the 3.0L Cosworth DFV V8 still in wide use at the time in Formula One, though Renault's power did lag behind the new  turbocharged engine being used by Ferrari. In keeping with everything French on the car, the tyres used by Renault were Michelin.

The driving lineup for the all French team was made up at the time entirely of French drivers. Driving the RE20 in 1980 were Jean-Pierre Jabouille and René Arnoux, while in 1981 Arnoux continued with the team but Jabouille was replaced by a young Alain Prost who had made his Formula One debut in 1980 for McLaren.

The Renault RE20 achieved three Grand Prix wins during the 1980 season. Arnoux won both the Brazilian and South African races while Jabouille was the winner of the Austrian Grand Prix.

A modified version of the car, the RE20B, raced in first five races of the  season. The RE20B was replaced by the Renault RE30.

Complete Formula One World Championship results

(key) (note: results shown in bold indicate pole position; results in italics indicate fastest lap)

* 48 points scored in  using the Renault RE30

References

RE20
1980 Formula One season cars
1981 Formula One season cars